IRAP may refer to:

 The International Refugee Assistance Project
The International Road Assessment Programme
 The Implicit Relational Assessment Procedure
Interleukin 1 receptor antagonist, a protein
IRAP PhD Program, an international joint doctorate program in relativistic astrophysics
IRAP RMS Suite, a software suite for geomodelling and designing reservoirs
 Insulin responsive aminopeptidase, an alias for Leucyl/cystinyl aminopeptidase